Malkani is a surname. Notable people with the surname include:

Gautam Malkani (born 1976), English writer
K. R. Malkani (1921–2003), Indian politician and historian
Mangharam Udharam Malkani (1896–1980), Indian scholar, critic, writer, playwright, literary historian, and professor
N. R. Malkani (1890–1974), Indian activist